Blade Runner 2049 – Original Motion Picture Soundtrack is the soundtrack album for the 2017 film Blade Runner 2049. Released in October 2017, the album contains music composed by Hans Zimmer and Benjamin Wallfisch, along with additional tracks by Elvis Presley, Frank Sinatra and Lauren Daigle. The soundtrack was produced by Michael Hodges, Kayla Morrison and Ashley Culp. It also includes the piece "Tears in the Rain", which was originally composed and performed (as "Tears in Rain") by Vangelis, the composer of the original 1982 soundtrack Blade Runner.

Blade Runner 2049 is the sequel to  Ridley Scott's 1982 film Blade Runner. Directed by Denis Villeneuve, it stars Ryan Gosling and Harrison Ford, Ana de Armas, Sylvia Hoeks and Jared Leto. Set thirty years after the original film, the story depicts a bioengineered human, a replicant blade runner named K, who discovers the remains of a once-pregnant replicant. To prevent a possible war between replicants and humans, K is secretly tasked with finding the child and destroying all evidence related to it.

The soundtrack was nominated for the BAFTA Award for Best Film Music at the 71st British Academy Film Awards. In 2018, the Soundtrack received a Grammy nomination for Best Score Soundtrack for visual media, losing to Ludwig Göransson's score for Black Panther.

History 
Warner Bros. reportedly considered engaging the rapper and music producer El-P to write the film score for Blade Runner 2049, and he was commissioned to write a short score for the film's first trailer. Conscious of the legacy of Vangelis's score for the original 1982 film, El-P's composition made use of a  Yamaha CS-80 analog synthesizer, an instrument used by Vangelis. However, El-P's music was not used in the end, and he has stated that his score was "rejected or ignored".

Jóhann Jóhannsson, who had worked with Villeneuve on Prisoners, Sicario, and Arrival, was initially announced as composer for the film. However, Villeneuve and Jóhannsson decided to end the collaboration because Villeneuve felt the film "needed something different, and I needed to go back to something closer to Vangelis's soundtrack". New composers Hans Zimmer and Benjamin Wallfisch joined in July 2017. In September, Jóhannsson's agent confirmed that he was no longer involved and that he was contractually forbidden from commenting on the situation.

According to Epic Records, Zimmer and Wallfisch sought to continue the legacy of the original Blade Runner score by incorporating the Yamaha CS-80 synthesizer. Zimmer has said of the soundtrack: "First of all, I realized that Denis [Villeneuve] is a director who has a vision; he has a voice. Remember, I've done a lot of movies with Ridley Scott. So, it was important that this was an autonomous piece of work. Let's just be honest. Ridley is a hard act to follow—as is Vangelis. While Ben [Wallfisch] was four-years-old, I had actually experienced all of this. We watched and literally, as we stopped watching, we decided on the palette. We decided this wasn't going to be an orchestral thing. The story spoke to us."

Release 
The soundtrack album was released online on October 5, 2017, and a two-disc CD version was released on the Epic Records/ASG Records label in the United States on October 27.

On October 25, 2017, it was announced that a vinyl double-LP of the soundtrack album would be released on December 15, 2017, in a numbered limited edition of 2500, pressed on 180-gram premium vinyl, intended for audiophiles. Although the information about the release mentioned that the album would have 24 tracks, the advertised tracks on sites selling it shows only 20 tracks, with the tracks by Frank Sinatra and Elvis Presley being omitted from the LPs.

Track listing 

Note  indicates tracks that are not on the limited edition two-LP vinyl release

Charts

References

External links 
 Official film website

Soundtrack
2017 soundtrack albums
Epic Records soundtracks
Hans Zimmer soundtracks
Science fiction film soundtracks